This is a list of famous Galician people.

Arts

Delmi Álvarez, photographer
Maruja Mallo (1902–1995), painter
Mariano Grueiro (born 1975), activist, writer, photographer, filmmaker, artist
Francisco Calvelo (born 1982), filmmaker
Fernando Álvarez de Sotomayor y Zaragoza (1875–1960), painter
Gregorio Fernández (1576–1636), Baroque sculptor
Victor Moscoso (born 1936), Spanish-American artist
Luís Seoane (1910–1979), lithographer and artist
Isaac Díaz Pardo (1920–2012), artist and businessman

Actors
María Casares (1922–1996)
José Garcia (actor) (born 1966)
Nancho Novo (born 1958)
La Belle Otero (1868–1965), dancer, actress, and courtesan
Fernando Rey (1917–1994)
Martin Sheen a.k.a. Ramon Estevez (born 1940) (part Irish, part Galician)
Charlie Sheen a.k.a. Carlos Estevez (born 1965) (father part Galician)
Emilio Estevez (born 1962) (father part Galician)
Luis Tosar (born 1971)
Jesús Vázquez (born 1965)
Paula Vázquez (born 1974)
Pedro Alonso (born 1971)
Dafne Keen (born 2005) (mother Galician)

Musicians
 Bernal de Bonaval (13th century), troubadour
Avelino Cachafeiro (1899–1972), bagpiper
Luz Casal (born 1958), singer
Manu Chao (born 1961) (father from Vilalba), singer
Martín Codax (fl. 13th and 14th centuries), medieval composer and performer
Iván Ferreiro (born 1970), singer
Fuxan Os Ventos, folk music group
Jerry Garcia (1942–1995) (part Galician, part Irish and Swedish), founding member of American rock group The Grateful Dead
Isabel Granada (born 1976) (mother from Ferrol), singer
Enrique Iglesias (born 1975) (grandfather from Ourense), singer
Julio Iglesias (born 1943) (father from Ourense), singer
Carlos Leal (born 1969), Swiss rapper and actor born to Galician immigrants
Xoel López, singer
Anxo Lorenzo (born 1974), bagpiper
Luar na Lubre, Celtic music group
Mendinho (fl. 13th century), medieval troubadour
Milladoiro, Celtic music group
Carlos Núñez (born 1971), musician and bagpiper
Natalia Oreiro (born 1977), singer
Cristina Pato (born 1970), bagpiper
Manuel Ramil (born 1978), power metal keyboardist
Paulina Rubio (born 1971) (father from A Coruña), singer
Marta Sánchez (born 1966) (both parents from A Coruña), singer
Susana Seivane (born 1976), bagpiper
Siniestro Total, punk rock group
Los Suaves, hard rock band
Octavio Vázquez (born 1972), composer

Writers

 
Marilar Aleixandre (born 1947)
Concepción Arenal (1820–1893), writer and feminist
Xela Arias (1962–2003)
Eduardo Blanco Amor (1897–1979), writer and journalist
Carmen Blanco (born 1954)
Xurxo Borrazás (born 1963)
Castelao (1886–1950), writer, politician, and painter
Ricardo Carvalho Calero (1910–1990)
Yolanda Castaño (born 1977), poet
Rosalía de Castro (1837–1885), writer
Camilo José Cela (1916–2002), writer, Nobel Prize in Literature
Ramón Chao (1935–2018)
Álvaro Cunqueiro (1911–1981), writer and journalist
Manuel Curros Enríquez (1851–1908), writer
 Berta Dávila (born 1987), writer, poet
María Magdalena Domínguez (1922-2021), poet 
Estíbaliz Espinosa  (born 1974) poet, science writer
Benito Jerónimo Feijóo y Montenegro (1676–1764)
Wenceslao Fernández Flórez (1885–1964)
Agustín Fernández Mallo (born 1967) 
Celso Emilio Ferreiro (1912–1979) 
Xesús Ferro Ruibal (born 1944)
Ricardo Flores Peres (1903–2002)
Suso de Toro (born 1956), writer
Béa González, (born 1962), writer
Beremundo González Rodríguez (1909–1986)
Juana Teresa Juega López (1885-1979), poet 
Salvador de Madariaga (1886–1978), diplomat, writer, historian, and pacifist
Luis Mariñas (1947–2010), journalist
María Mariño (1907–1967)
Xosé Luís Méndez Ferrín (born 1938), writer, proposed for the Nobel Prize

José María Merino (born 1941)
Manuel Murguía (1833–1923) 
Xosé Neira Vilas (1928–2015)  
Olga Novo (born 1975)
Albino Núñez Domínguez (1901–1974)
Pilar Pallarés (born 1957), poet
Emilia Pardo Bazán (1851–1921), writer and feminist
Chus Pato (born 1955)
Otero Pedrayo (1888–1976)
Eduardo Pondal (1835–1917) 
José María Posada (1817–1886)
Luz Pozo Garza (1922-2020), poet
Ignacio Ramonet (born 1943) 
Jacinto Rey (born 1972)
Ofelia Rey Castelao (born 1956)
Vicente Risco (1884–1963), writer and politician
Manuel Rivas (born 1957), writer
Juan Rodríguez de la Cámara (1390–1450)
Claudio Rodriguez Fer (born 1956)
Fátima Rodríguez (b. 1961), writer, translator, professor
Luís Seoane (1910–1979) 
Gonzalo Torrente Ballester (1910–1999), writer
Ramón del Valle-Inclán (1866–1936), writer
Lorenzo Varela (1917–1978) 
Martin Veiga (born 1970) 
Benito Vicetto Pérez (1824–1878) 
Darío Villanueva (born 1950), literary theorist and critic, director of the Real Academia Española
Miguel Ángel Villar Pinto  (born 1977)
Antón Vilar Ponte (1881–1936)

Business
Carmela Arias y Díaz de Rábago (1920–2009), first woman president of a bank in Spain
Adolfo Dominguez
Rosalia Mera, co-founder of the Inditex Group
Amancio Ortega founder of global fashion manufacturing and retail chain Inditex
Antonio M. Pérez (born 1947), Spanish-American businessman

Exploration
Pedro Madruga, real name Pedro Alvarez de Sotomayor, alias Cristóbal Colon (Christopher Columbus) (fl. 1434–1506), navigator and explorer
Juan de Betanzos, historical source on the Incan civilization
João da Nova (1460-1509) navigator and explorer
Vasco Núñez de Balboa, (1475–1519) (Galician noble from Balboa), explorer and conquistador, discoverer of the Pacific Ocean
Luís Vaz de Torres (1565–1607), navigator and explorer, first European who saw Australia
Álvaro de Mendaña de Neira (1542–1595), navigator and explorer, discoverer of Marquesas Islands and Salomon Islands
Isabel Barreto (1567–1612), navigator and explorer, first female Admiral in history 
Rodrigo de Quiroga, conquistador, Royal Governor of Chile
Pedro Sarmiento de Gamboa, explorer and historian
Benito de Soto (1805-1830), pirate

Military
Ángel Castro y Argiz (1875–1956), father of Fidel and Raúl Castro
Juan de Lángara (1736–1806), naval officer and Minister of Marine
Pedro Mariño de Lobera (1528–1594), soldier and chronicler of the Arauco War
Casto Méndez Núñez (1824–1869), admiral
Patricio Montojo, naval commander at the Battle of Manila Bay
Alonso Pita da Veiga (fl. 1513–1529), military officer
Maria Pita, soldier

Nobility
Alfonso VII of León and Castile (1105–1157), King of Galicia, León, and Castile
Alfonso X of Castile (1221–1284), King of Galicia and Castile
Diego Sarmiento de Acuña, 1st Count of Gondomar (1567–1626), Spanish ambassador to England
Fernán Pérez de Andrade (fl. 1356–1397), Galician knight
Fernando de Andrade de las Mariñas (1477–1540), First Count of Andrade and Second of Vilalba, Lord of Pontedeume and Ferrol
Fernando Pérez de Traba (1090–1155), count of the Crown of León
Fernando Ruiz de Castro (fl. 1354–1377), nobleman of the House of Castro
Fernando Ruiz de Castro Andrade y Portugal (1548–1601), nobleman, Viceroy of Naples
Gaspar de Zúñiga, 5th Count of Monterrey (1560–1606), nobleman, Viceroy of New Spain
Inês de Castro (1325–1355), noblewoman, consort of King Peter I of Portugal
Manuel de Acevedo y Zúñiga (fl. 1628–1637), Viceroy of Naples
Menendo González (fl. 997–1008), Duke of Galicia and Count of Portugal
Pedro Fernández de Castro y Andrade (1560–1622), nobleman, Viceroy of Naples
Sueiro Gomes de Soutomaior (1417–1490), aristocrat in the kingdom of Galicia
Vímara Peres (820–873), first ruler of the County of Portugal

Politics

Fidel Castro (both parents from Galicia) former president of Cuba
Raúl Castro (both parents from Galicia) former president of Cuba, incumbent first secretary of the Communist Party of Cuba
Pablo Iglesias founder of the Socialist Workers' Party (PSOE) in 1879 and the Spanish General Workers' Union (UGT) in 1888
Tabaré Vázquez (of Galician ancestry) president of Uruguay
Francisco Franco was the leader and later formal head of state of Spain from October 1936, and of all of Spain from 1939 until his death in 1975
Manuel Fraga Iribarne was President of the Xunta of Galicia from 1990 to 2005 and founder of the People's Alliance (Spain) (Alianza Popular - AP), later refounded as the People's Party (Spain) (Partido Popular - PP).
Anxo Quintana politician, former leader of the Galician Nationalist Block (Bloque Nacionalista Galego), the main Galician Nationalist party
Adolfo Suárez González (his father was from La Coruña) Spain's first democratically elected prime minister after the end of Francoist Spain
Xosé Manuel Beiras politician, economist, writer and intellectual
Benigno Álvares Leader and founder of Galician Communist Party
Alexandre Bóveda
Elena Espinosa Minister of the Environment and currently represents Ourense in the Spanish Congress
Amada Garcia Communist activist
Francisco Caamaño Domínguez (born 1963)
Rosario Hernández Diéguez, newspaper hawker and trade unionist affiliated with UGT and PSOE
José Patiño (1666–1736) secretary of state 
Ricardo Mella writer, intellectual and libertarian activist
Emilio Pérez Touriño politician and economist
Mariano Rajoy was leader of the conservative People's Party (PP) and prime minister of Spain until a vote of no confidence ousted his government
Alfonso Daniel Rodríguez Castelao writer, politician and one of the main symbols of Galician nationalism
Elena Salgado former Second Vice President and Minister of Economy and Finance in Spain
Juan Niño de Tabora former governor of the Philippines.
Ramón Franco pioneer of aviation, a political figure and brother of later caudillo Francisco Franco
Juan Camilo Mouriño, politician
Enrique Líster Forján, a communist politician and military, serving as a general in the armies of the Spanish Republic, the Soviet Red Army and the Yugoslav People's Army
José Calvo Sotelo (1893–1936) leader of the opposition, his assassination by Socialists agents marked the outbreak of the Spanish civil war
Eugenio Montero Ríos (1832–1914) prime minister of Spain (19th century)
José Canalejas (1854- 1912) prime minister of Spain (20th century)
Manuel Portela Valladares (1868–1952) prime minister of Spain (20th century)
Eduardo Dato e Iradier (1856–1921) prime minister of Spain (20th century, 3 times)
Santiago Casares Quiroga Prime Minister of Spain when Spanish civil war broke out

Religion
Alonso III Fonseca (1475–1534), Catholic archbishop and politician
Antonio María Rouco Varela (born 1936), Catholic prelate
Benito Jerónimo Feijoo e Montenegro, neoclassical monk and scholar
Diego Gelmírez (1069–1149), Catholic archbishop
Hydatius (400–469), Catholic bishop
Marina of Aguas Santas (119–139), Portuguese Catholic saint
Pope Damasus I (305–384)
Rudesind (907–977), Catholic bishop and abbot
Senorina (fl. 982), Catholic abbess
Theodemar of Iria (fl. 818–847), Catholic bishop

Sportspeople

David Cal (born 1982), flatwater canoer
Támara Echegoyen (born 1984), sailor
Beatriz Gómez Cortés (born 1994), Olympic swimmer
Francisco Javier Gómez Noya (born 1983), triathlete
Juan López Mella (1965–1995), motorcycle racer
Ana Peleteiro  (born 1995), triple jumper, 2020 Olympic bronze medallist
Carlos Pérez (born 1979), flatwater canoer
Iván Raña (born 1979), triathlete
Fran Vázquez (born 1983), basketball player

Cycling 
Gustavo César (born 1980)
David García Dapena (born 1977)
Vicente López Carril (born 1942)
Ezequiel Mosquera (born 1975)
Óscar Pereiro (born 1977), winner of the 2006 Tour de France
Álvaro Pino (born 1956)
Gonzalo Rabuñal (born 1984)
Delio Rodríguez (1916–1994), winner of the 1945 Vuelta a España
Emilio Rodríguez (1923–1984), winner of the 1950 Vuelta a España

Football
Amancio Amaro (born 1939), former Spanish international, 1964 European Championship winner
Iago Aspas (born 1987), Spanish international
Verónica Boquete (born 1987), Spanish women's international
Paco Buyo (born 1958), former Spanish international
Ricardo Cabanas (born 1979), former Swiss international
Fran (born 1969), former Spanish international
Jorge Otero (born 1969), former Spanish international
Pahiño (born 1923), former Spanish international
Míchel Salgado (born 1975), former Spanish international
Luis Suárez (born 1935), former Spanish international, 1964 European Championship winner, Ballon d'Or winner
Lucas Vázquez (born 1991), Spanish international

Others
Ana Romero Masiá Galician historian
Benito de Soto (1805–1830), pirate
Ramón Menéndez Pidal (1869–1968), philologist and historian
Antonio Palacios (1872–1945), architect
Domingo de Andrade (1639–1712), Baroque architect
Simón Rodríguez (1769–1854), philosopher and educator

References

 
Galician
Galician